David Hilary Jones (born 29 December 1950) is an English former professional footballer who played as a winger in the Football League for York City, in non-League football for Goole Town, and was on the books of Wolverhampton Wanderers without making a league appearance.

References

1950 births
Living people
Footballers from Bradford
English footballers
Association football wingers
Wolverhampton Wanderers F.C. players
York City F.C. players
Goole Town F.C. players
Selby Town F.C. players
English Football League players